Georgetown is an unincorporated community and census-designated place (CDP) in Bart Township, Lancaster County, Pennsylvania, United States. As of the 2010 census the population was 1,022. Georgetown has a post office for P.O. boxes that is called Bart and has the ZIP code of 17503. Otherwise, the CDP is divided into three ZIP code areas for more distant communities.

Half of the small community of Nickel Mines, the site of the 2006 Amish school shooting, is within the Georgetown CDP. The alleged shooter, Charles Carl Roberts IV, was a resident of Georgetown, where he lived with his wife and children.

Geography
Georgetown is located in southern Lancaster County in northern Bart Township, an area with a large concentration of Amish residents. The main roads running through the village are Georgetown Road (Pennsylvania Route 896) and the Christiana Pike (PA Route 372). Route 896 leads northwest  to Strasburg and southeast  to Newark, Delaware, while Route 372 leads east  to Christiana and southwest  to Quarryville.

The village of Nickel Mines is along the northern border of the CDP, and the village of Green Tree is on the southern border. Nickel Mines Run, a headwaters of the West Branch of Octoraro Creek, flows southward through the eastern part of the CDP. The entire community, via Octoraro Creek, is part of the Susquehanna River watershed.

Demographics

References

Populated places in Lancaster County, Pennsylvania
Census-designated places in Lancaster County, Pennsylvania